Scott F. Talley (born June 25, 1976) is an American politician. He is a member of the South Carolina Senate from the 12th District, serving since 2016. He is a member of the Republican party.

References

Living people
1976 births
Republican Party South Carolina state senators
21st-century American politicians
People from Spartanburg, South Carolina
Wofford College alumni
University of South Carolina School of Law alumni